Morigaon College, established in 1964, is one of the oldest undergraduate, coeducational college situated in Morigaon, Assam. This college is affiliated with the Gauhati University.

Departments

Science
Physics
Mathematics
Chemistry
Anthropology
Botany
Zoology

Arts and Commerce
Assamese
English
Disaster Management
History
Education
Economics
Philosophy
Political Science
Hindi
Geography
Commerce

References

External links
http://morigaoncollege.edu.in

Universities and colleges in Assam
Colleges affiliated to Gauhati University
Educational institutions established in 1964
1964 establishments in Assam